Adbri, formerly Adelaide Brighton Cement, is an Australian manufacturer of cement, lime and dry blended products.

Adbri operates manufacturing and distribution facilities in South Australia, the Northern Territory, and New South Wales. Associated brands and companies include Cockburn Cement, Sunstate Cement, Northern Cement, Independent Cement & Lime, and Building Product Supplies. The company's Geelong Cement works, at Fyansford, was closed in 2001.

The company is listed on the Australian Securities Exchange.

Mining and processing facilities
Angaston plant
Birkenhead plant
Klein Point, limestone quarry 
Rapid Bay limestone quarry

History
William Lewis, a Welsh immigrant, established lime kilns in 1880 on an allotment near the corner of Brighton and Shoreham Roads, Adelaide, South Australia.  Several kilometres south, what is now Marino to Reynella and Hallett Cove, were rich limestone deposits.  The rocks formed part of the great Precambrian limestone formations known geologically as the Brighton Series.

Two years later, Lewis built a larger kiln, closer to the limestone deposits, fifteen feet square and twenty feet high. So began the Brighton Cement Works, which were officially opened on 12 December 1882. There was a bright future for the production of local cement, as at that time, South Australia was importing 8,000 tons of portland cement a year.

But the promising start soon faded, with Lewis closing the works in 1883 due to poor sales, attributed to the local product being too expensive and not as good quality as the imported cement.

However, other colonists took up the challenge. Brompton brickmaker, William Shearing became involved. Some years later, a syndicate including John Howard Angas and Simpson Newland bought the Works. In 1896, quality of the local cement appeared solid, with the product being used in the construction of the Happy Valley Reservoir. By 1900 the company had  and were selling over 3,500 tons a year. A major setback occurred on 7 November 1909, when the works were consumed by fire.

Carting rock and coal was a significant task, with horse and dray being a familiar sight. In 1913, the company owned 74 horses.  Stablehands began at 4 am with grooming and feeding. Drivers were ready at 6:45 am for the  hour trip from the Works to the city carrying cement, returning via Bromptom, where coke was loaded.  Horse-drawn trolleys were also used to cart additional stone from the Reynella quarries to the Reynella railway station, to be freighted to the Marino site by rail. Eventually the Reynella horses were replaced by the Flying Fox. This labour-saving aerial ropeway became somewhat of a tourist attraction.

The Brighton Cement works moved to Angaston in the 1950s. Brighton Cement merged with Adelaide Cement Company to become Adelaide Brighton Cement in the 1970s.

General references

References

External links
Adelaide Brighton Cement website

Companies listed on the Australian Securities Exchange
Mining companies of Australia
Cement companies of Australia
Manufacturing companies based in Adelaide
Australian companies established in 1882
Lime kilns in Australia